Butteryhaugh is a village in Northumberland, in England. It is situated a short distance to the south-east of Kielder.

Although a separate "village" from Kielder, Kielder is generally accepted as including Butteryhaugh. Butteryhaugh was intended to be the second of five villages to be built in the area to accommodate forestry workers at Kielder Forest. With the mechanisation of forest activities, and hence the need for fewer workers, the final three villages were never constructed.

The village is from the border with Scotland.

Governance 
Butteryhaugh is in the parliamentary constituency of Hexham.

References

External links

Villages in Northumberland